Leave All Fair is a 1985 New Zealand made film starring John Gielgud as John Middleton Murry the husband of Katherine Mansfield.
He is presented as a sanctimonious exploiter of her memory, who ill-treated her during their association. Jane Birkin plays both Mansfield in flashbacks and the fictitious Marie Taylor who finds a letter from the dying Mansfield to Murry in his papers.

The theme was developed by New Zealand director Stanley Harper, but he was fired two weeks before shooting, and John Reid took over the project, introducing the "ghost" element and the two time frames. Shot in France at Moulin d'Ande and St Pierre du Vauvray with finance raised by Pacific Films, the film had to be finished before the 1984 cut-off date for New Zealand tax breaks.

Plot
The film is set in France in 1956, 33 years after the death of Mansfield and a year before Murry’s own death.
Murry visits André de Sarry a (fictional) French publisher who is about to publish an edition of her collected letters and journals. Murry is presented as struggling with his conscience as he recalls the ill and alone Mansfield (seen in flashbacks), and decides to publish almost all of her work.

de Sarry’s New Zealand partner Marie Taylor reads Mansfield’s work and among Middleton Murry’s papers finds a letter to him from the dying Mansfield. She confronts him as "another exploitative male" who makes a sanctimonious speech at the book launch. The letter from Mansfield says (rather ambiguously):

I should like him to publish as little as possible …He will understand that I desire to leave as few traces of my camping ground as possible .... All my manuscripts I leave entirely to you to do what you like with .... Please destroy all letters you do not wish to keep and all papers .... Have a clean sweep.... and leave all fair, will you.

Cast
 John Gielgud as John Middleton Murry 
 Jane Birkin as both Katherine Mansfield and Marie Taylor 
 Féodor Atkine as André de Sarry 
 Simon Ward as young John (John Jeune) 
  as Lisa
 Maurice Chevit as Alain 
 Mireille Alcantara as Violetta 
 Leonard Pezzino as Alfredo

Film reception
Helen Martin says the film is "beautifully shot in the European tradition" and it was described at the London Film Festival as "arguably the best film to come out of New Zealand so far", but others criticised the portrayal of Middleton Murry as "simplifying the KM/Murry relationship into a cliché".
Variety said it was "an affecting experience".

References

External links
 
 Leave All Fair at NZ On Screen (with video extracts)

1985 films
New Zealand drama films
Films set in France
1985 drama films
Films set in the 1950s
Films shot in France
1980s New Zealand films
1980s English-language films